Skeletocutis albocremea is a species of poroid fungus in the family Polyporaceae. It was described as new to science by Alix David in 1982. It was reported as new to Russia in 2004.

References

Fungi described in 1982
Fungi of Europe
albocremea